Utagawa Kuniteru (active 1818-1860) was an ukiyo-e artist in the tradition of the Utagawa school. Born in Edo (Tokyo), he studied under both Kunisada and Toyokuni I. He produced prints of a wide variety of subjects, including many depicting the increasing Western influence on Japan, with his main output taking the form of book illustrations and single-sheet ukiyo-e.

He was known by various names: he called himself Kunitsuna II or Ichiransai until the Ganji era (1864/1865). Before 1844 he may also have been known as Sadashige and signed works using the name Ichiyusai.

As Kunitsuna II he concentrated on caricatures and scenes from his travels. After taking his master's name, he expanded his range to include scenes of sumo wrestling, and the modernization and westernization of Japan.

Gallery

References

 

19th-century Japanese painters
Utagawa school